The 1879 Ennis by-election was fought on 26 July 1879.  The byelection was fought due to the death of the incumbent Home Rule MP, William Stacpoole.  It was won by the Home Rule candidate James Lysaght Finegan.

References

Ennis
By-elections to the Parliament of the United Kingdom in County Clare constituencies
1879 elections in the United Kingdom
Unopposed by-elections to the Parliament of the United Kingdom (need citation)
1879 elections in Ireland